Turtleford was a provincial electoral district  for the Legislative Assembly of the province of Saskatchewan, Canada, centered on the town of Turtleford.

Created before the 4th Saskatchewan general election in 1917, this constituency was dissolved and combined with the Cut Knife district (as "Battleford-Cut Knife") before the 23rd Saskatchewan general election in 1995. It is now part of the ridings of Cut Knife-Turtleford and Rosthern-Shellbrook.

Members of the Legislative Assembly

Election results

 
|Conservative
|Hugh Lockhart
|align="right"|424
|align="right"|19.69%
|- bgcolor="white"
!align="left" colspan=3|Total
!align="right"|2,154
!align="right"|100.00%
!align="right"|

|-

 
|Independent
|Frederick Webb
|align="right"|1,063
|align="right"|47.27%
|align="right"|–
|- bgcolor="white"
!align="left" colspan=3|Total
!align="right"|2,249
!align="right"|100.00%
!align="right"|

|-

|- bgcolor="white"
!align="left" colspan=3|Total
!align="right"|1,907
!align="right"|100.00%
!align="right"|

|-

 
|Independent
|Percival Whitman Farnsworth
|align="right"|1,603
|align="right"|49.61%
|align="right"|-
|- bgcolor="white"
!align="left" colspan=3|Total
!align="right"|3,231
!align="right"|100.00%
!align="right"|

|-

 
|Conservative
|Percival Whitman Farnsworth
|align="right"|1,599
|align="right"|24.60%
|align="right"|-25.01
 
|Farmer-Labour
|John Stegehuis
|align="right"|1,489
|align="right"|22.91%
|align="right"|–
|- bgcolor="white"
!align="left" colspan=3|Total
!align="right"|6,499
!align="right"|100.00%
!align="right"|

|-

 
|Conservative
|Walter Arnold Hicks
|align="right"|456
|align="right"|6.93%
|align="right"|-17.67
 
|CCF
|John Stegehuis
|align="right"|440
|align="right"|6.69%
|align="right"|-16.22
|- bgcolor="white"
!align="left" colspan=3|Total
!align="right"|6,580
!align="right"|100.00%
!align="right"|

|-
 
|style="width: 130px"|CCF
|Bob Wooff
|align="right"|2,506
|align="right"|53.65%
|align="right"|+46.96

 
|Prog. Conservative
|Chester Hicks
|align="right"|399
|align="right"|8.54%
|align="right"|+1.61
|- bgcolor="white"
!align="left" colspan=3|Total
!align="right"|4,671
!align="right"|100.00%
!align="right"|

|-

 
|CCF
|Bob Wooff
|align="right"|2,280
|align="right"|37.38%
|align="right"|-16.27

|- bgcolor="white"
!align="left" colspan=3|Total
!align="right"|6,099
!align="right"|100.00%
!align="right"|

|-
 
|style="width: 130px"|CCF
|Bob Wooff
|align="right"|2,893
|align="right"|46.36%
|align="right"|+8.98

|- bgcolor="white"
!align="left" colspan=3|Total
!align="right"|6,240
!align="right"|100.00%
!align="right"|

|-

 
|CCF
|Bob Wooff
|align="right"|2,311
|align="right"|39.98%
|align="right"|-6.38

|- bgcolor="white"
!align="left" colspan=3|Total
!align="right"|5,780
!align="right"|100.00%
!align="right"|

|-
 
|style="width: 130px"|CCF
|Bob Wooff
|align="right"|2,074
|align="right"|37.28%
|align="right"|-2.70

 
|Prog. Conservative
|Harvey S. Scott
|align="right"|871
|align="right"|15.65%
|align="right"|-

|- bgcolor="white"
!align="left" colspan=3|Total
!align="right"|5,564
!align="right"|100.00%
!align="right"|

|-

 
|CCF
|Bob Wooff
|align="right"|2,517
|align="right"|44.60%
|align="right"|+7.32
|- bgcolor="white"
!align="left" colspan=3|Total
!align="right"|5,643
!align="right"|100.00%
!align="right"|

|-
 
|style="width: 130px"|CCF
|Bob Wooff
|align="right"|2,221
|align="right"|37.99%
|align="right"|-6.61

 
|Prog. Conservative
|William E. Armstrong
|align="right"|1,502
|align="right"|25.69%
|align="right"|-
|- bgcolor="white"
!align="left" colspan=3|Total
!align="right"|5,846
!align="right"|100.00%
!align="right"|

|-
 
|style="width: 130px"|NDP
|Bob Wooff
|align="right"|2,152
|align="right"|42.28%
|align="right"|+4.29

 
|Prog. Conservative
|Hugh E. Konsmo
|align="right"|813
|align="right"|15.97%
|align="right"|-9.72
|- bgcolor="white"
!align="left" colspan=3|Total
!align="right"|5,090
!align="right"|100.00%
!align="right"|

|-
 
|style="width: 130px"|NDP
|Michael Feduniak
|align="right"|3,092
|align="right"|55.20%
|align="right"|+12.92

|- bgcolor="white"
!align="left" colspan=3|Total
!align="right"|5,601
!align="right"|100.00%
!align="right"|

|-
 
|style="width: 130px"|NDP
|Lloyd Johnson
|align="right"|2,405
|align="right"|39.65%
|align="right"|-15.55

 
|Progressive Conservative
|Gordon Mayer
|align="right"|1,666
|align="right"|27.47%
|align="right"|-
|- bgcolor="white"
!align="left" colspan=3|Total
!align="right"|6,065
!align="right"|100.00%
!align="right"|

|-
 
|style="width: 130px"|NDP
|Lloyd Johnson
|align="right"|2,983
|align="right"|51.51%
|align="right"|+11.86
 
|Progressive Conservative
|Charlie Wells
|align="right"|2,188
|align="right"|37.78%
|align="right"|+10.31

|- bgcolor="white"
!align="left" colspan=3|Total
!align="right"|5,791
!align="right"|100.00%
!align="right"|

|-
 
|style="width: 130px"|Progressive Conservative
|Colin Maxwell
|align="right"|3,825
|align="right"|56.39%
|align="right"|+18.61
 
|NDP
|Lloyd Johnson
|align="right"|2,803
|align="right"|41.32%
|align="right"|-10.19

|- bgcolor="white"
!align="left" colspan=3|Total
!align="right"|6,783
!align="right"|100.00%
!align="right"|

|-
 
|style="width: 130px"|Progressive Conservative
|Colin Maxwell
|align="right"|3,403
|align="right"|50.13%
|align="right"|-6.26
 
|NDP
|Chris Sorenson
|align="right"|2,968
|align="right"|43.73%
|align="right"|+2.41

|- bgcolor="white"
!align="left" colspan=3|Total
!align="right"|6,788
!align="right"|100.00%
!align="right"|

|-
 
|style="width: 130px"|NDP
|Lloyd Johnson
|align="right"|3,269
|align="right"|49.97%
|align="right"|+6.24
 
|Prog. Conservative
|Jerry Spenst
|align="right"|2,034
|align="right"|31.09%
|align="right"|-19.04

|- bgcolor="white"
!align="left" colspan=3|Total
!align="right"|6,542
!align="right"|100.00%
!align="right"|

See also 
Electoral district (Canada)
List of Saskatchewan provincial electoral districts
List of Saskatchewan general elections
List of political parties in Saskatchewan
Turtleford, Saskatchewan

References 
 Saskatchewan Archives Board – Saskatchewan Election Results By Electoral Division

Former provincial electoral districts of Saskatchewan